Mike Erwin (born August 31, 1978) sometimes credited as Michael Erwin, is an American actor who is best known for playing Colin Hart from 2002 to 2006 in the WB television series Everwood.

Early life
Erwin was born in Dalton, Georgia, on August 31, 1978. He graduated from James Martin High School.

Career
He has been more widely heard as the voice of Jak in the Jak and Daxter series from Jak II onward except in the case of Jak and Daxter: The Lost Frontier and PlayStation All-Stars Battle Royale. He is the voice of Speedy in Teen Titans. He has been a guest star on many TV shows and has also appeared in film.

Filmography

Film

Television

Video games

References

External links

1978 births
American male film actors
American male television actors
American male voice actors
American male video game actors
Living people
People from Dalton, Georgia
Male actors from Georgia (U.S. state)
21st-century American male actors